Aelurognathus is an extinct genus of gorgonopsian therapsids from the Permian of South Africa and Zambia.

Discovery
 
 
The type species is Aelurognathus tigriceps, originally named Scymnognathus tigriceps by South African paleontologists Robert Broom and Sydney H. Haughton in 1913, and later assigned to the new genus Aelurognathus by Haughton in 1924.

Scymnognathus parringtoni von Huene, 1950, previously assigned to Aelurognathus, is now classified as a species of Sauroctonus. Aelurognathus nyasaensis Haughton, 1926 is not referable to the genus.

Palaeobiology
A broken tooth beside the skeleton of a dicynodont from the Tropidostoma Assemblage Zone has been attributed to Aelurognathus, indicating that it scavenged. The bones of the back of the skeleton are the most scattered, suggesting that the Aelurognathus individuals fed on the rear of the carcass, removing the hind limbs to reach the soft underside. The small incisor teeth of Aelurognathus indicate that it was not able to crush bone but more likely stripped flesh from its prey like the modern-day wild dog Lycaon pictus. Bite marks on the bones of the skeleton were unlikely to have been made by Aelurognathus and may be an indication that another predator killed the dicynodont.

Classification
Below is a cladogram from the phylogenetic analysis of Gebauer (2007):

References

Gorgonopsia
Prehistoric therapsid genera
Permian synapsids of Africa
Fossil taxa described in 1924
Taxa named by Sidney H. Haughton